Osvaldo Lourenço Filho (born 11 April 1987), simply known as Osvaldo, is a Brazilian footballer as a forward for CSA. He is known for his explosive pace, dribbling ability and speed.

Career
On 24 January 2012, after a good year playing for Ceará, Osvaldo signed a contract with São Paulo FC, whom paid R$4.6 million to emirati side Al-Ahli Dubai for 50% of his rights.

After a bad phase, who occurred for all second semester of 2013, Osvaldo almost was exchanged with Fluminense FC to Wágner without agreement of him. But, in beginning of 2014, Osvaldo has played as before, and, after being the star of team in some important games - as in the first game of 2014 Copa do Brasil, in the victory by 1-0 against CSA, with his goal, the club has refused some good proposes, as one of Kashima Antlers.

On 18 January 2015 Osvaldo was signed by Al-Ahli Jeddah on a three-year contract.

International career
On March 13, 2013, after a Lucas's contusion in a game for his club, Paris Saint-Germain, Luiz Felipe Scolari called up Osvaldo to substitute his former colleague of club for friendlies against Italy and Russia on March 21 and March 25, respectively.

He made his début for Brazil on April 6, 2013, in the victory by 4–0 against Bolivia, as substitute for Neymar.

Career statistics
.

Honours
Ríver
Campeonato Piauiense: 2007

Fortaleza
Campeonato Cearense: 2008, 2019, 2020, 2021
Copa do Nordeste: 2019

Shabab Al-Ahli
UAE Pro League: 2008–09

Ceará
Campeonato Cearense: 2011

São Paulo
 Copa Sudamericana: 2012

Al Ahli
 Saudi Crown Prince Cup : 2014–15

Fluminense
 Primeira Liga : 2016

Buriram United
Thai League 1: 2018
Thailand Champions Cup: 2019

References

External links

1987 births
Living people
Brazilian footballers
Brazil international footballers
Brazilian expatriate footballers
Campeonato Brasileiro Série A players
Campeonato Brasileiro Série B players
Primeira Liga players
Saudi Professional League players
Thai League 1 players
Expatriate footballers in the United Arab Emirates
Expatriate footballers in Portugal
Expatriate footballers in Saudi Arabia
Expatriate footballers in Thailand
Brazilian expatriate sportspeople in the United Arab Emirates
Brazilian expatriate sportspeople in Portugal
Brazilian expatriate sportspeople in Saudi Arabia
Brazilian expatriate sportspeople in Thailand
Fortaleza Esporte Clube players
River Atlético Clube players
Al Ahli Club (Dubai) players
S.C. Braga players
Ceará Sporting Club players
São Paulo FC players
Al-Ahli Saudi FC players
Fluminense FC players
Sport Club do Recife players
Buriram United F.C. players
Centro Sportivo Alagoano players
Association football forwards
Sportspeople from Fortaleza